The Vaselines are a Scottish alternative rock band. Formed in Glasgow, Scotland in 1986, the band was originally a duo between its songwriters Eugene Kelly and Frances McKee, but later added James Seenan and Eugene's brother Charlie Kelly on bass and drums respectively from the band Secession. McKee had formerly been a member of a band named The Pretty Flowers with Duglas T. Stewart, Norman Blake, Janice McBride and Sean Dickson. Eugene Kelly had formerly played in The Famous Monsters.

History
The band formed in 1986, initially as a duo backed by a drum machine. Originally intending to create a fanzine, Kelly and McKee decided to form a band instead. Stephen Pastel of The Pastels is credited with coming up with their name. After playing their first gigs, they signed to Pastel's 53rd and 3rd label and recorded the Son of a Gun EP with him producing, released in summer 1987. The EP featured a cover of Divine's "You Think You're a Man" on its B-side. By late 1987, Eugene's brother Charlie Kelly had joined on drums with James Seenan on bass. With this line-up and with Stephen Pastel producing again, they recorded the Dying for It EP, released in early 1988. It featured the songs "Molly's Lips" and "Jesus Wants Me for a Sunbeam," both of which Nirvana would later cover. In June 1989 they released their first album, Dum-Dum, again on 53rd and 3rd but distributed by Rough Trade. The band broke up shortly after its release due jointly to the dissolution of 53rd and 3rd Records and the end of Kelly and McKee's romantic relationship. They briefly reformed in October 1990 to open for Nirvana when they played in Edinburgh.

Kelly went on to found the band Captain America (later renamed Eugenius after legal threats from Marvel Comics), supporting Nirvana on their UK tour. Following solo performances Kelly released the album Man Alive in 2004. McKee founded the bands Painkillers in 1994 and Suckle in 1997 before releasing her first solo album, Sunny Moon, in 2006.

Though they were not widely known outside Scotland during their short career, their association with Nirvana brought exposure to the band. Nirvana frontman Kurt Cobain once described Kelly and McKee as his "favorite songwriters in the whole world". With their songs "Son of a Gun" and "Molly's Lips" covered on Nirvana's album Incesticide and "Jesus Doesn't Want Me for a Sunbeam" covered on MTV Unplugged in New York, the band gained a new audience. At the 1991 Reading Festival, Kelly joined Nirvana on stage for a performance of "Molly's Lips". "I've never made any money apart from my Nirvana royalties," Kelly noted. "It was my tiny bit of rock history, but a strange feeling because by then I was striving for recognition with other bands. I still haven't come to terms with it, although it allowed me to go on playing, and get a mortgage without having a job."

In 1992, Sub Pop released The Way of the Vaselines: A Complete History, a compilation that contained The Vaselines' entire body of work at the time.

The story of the Vaselines from 1986 to the early 1990s is covered in the 2017 documentary Teenage Superstars, in which both McKee and Kelly feature.

Reformation
In the summer of 2006, McKee and Kelly took to the stage together for the first time since 1990 to perform a set of Vaselines songs, as part of a joint tour to promote their individual solo albums.

The Vaselines reformed (minus the old rhythm section) on 24 April 2008 for a charity show for the Malawi Orphan Support group at Glasgow's MONO venue. Invitation was by word-of-mouth with no press announcements and the band played to a packed, enthusiastic audience.

The Vaselines performed on 16 May 2008 at Scotland's Tigerfest. Members of Belle and Sebastian supported their live set. The band then played their first-ever U.S. performance at Maxwell's in Hoboken, NJ on 9 July. The band also performed at Sub Pop Records' 20th Anniversary SP20 music festival on 12 July at Marymoor Park just outside Seattle WA.

On 27 March 2009 they played their first London date in 20 years at the London Forum.

On 5 May Sub Pop released Enter the Vaselines. A deluxe-edition reissue of the 1992 Sub Pop release, it includes remastered versions of the band’s two EPs (Son of a Gun and Dying for It), and a remixed version of their sole album (Dum-Dum), as well as demos and live recordings from 1986 and 1988. The band toured the U.S. in May 2009, playing six dates, starting in Los Angeles on 10 May, then heading up the west coast to San Francisco, Portland and Seattle. Dates for Chicago, IL and Brooklyn, NY would end the tour on 18 May. The band finished their May tour at the Primavera Sound festival in Barcelona.

On 19 July 2009 The Vaselines played the Uncut Arena at the Latitude Festival in Suffolk.

On 9 October 2009 The Vaselines made a long-awaited return to Edinburgh to support Mudhoney at HMV Picture House.

The band were chosen personally by Belle and Sebastian to perform at their second Bowlie Weekender festival presented by All Tomorrow's Parties in the UK in December 2010.

The band performed a cover version of the Nirvana song "Lithium" as part of a Spin Magazine's exclusive album, Newermind. It is the Nirvana album Nevermind, performed by different artists.

The Vaselines second studio album, Sex With an X, was released in September 2010.

The Vaselines announced their third studio album, V for Vaselines, in June 2014 which was released on 29 September 2014 on Rosary Music. "One Lost Year" from the album was made available for free download from their SoundCloud page. The single "High Tide Low Tide" followed in August, being released as a digital download and 7-inch vinyl.

Current members
Eugene Kelly – vocals, guitar, harmonica (1986–1990, 2006, 2008–present)
Frances McKee – vocals, guitar (1986–1990, 2006, 2008–present)
Michael McGaughrin – drums (2009–present)
Graeme Smillie  – bass, keyboards (2014–present)
Carla Easton – keyboards (2017–present)

Former members
James Seenan – bass (1987–1990)
Charlie Kelly – drums (1987–1990)
Stevie Jackson – guitar (2008–2014)
Bobby Kildea – bass (2008–2014)
Paul Foley – guitar (2010–2011)
Gareth Russell – bass (2010–2011)
Scott Paterson – guitar (2014–2016)

Discography

LPs

EPs

Compilations

Sources
Ankeny, Jason. "The Vaselines Allmusic. Retrieved 2 May 2004.

References

External links

Record label for Frances McKee's 'Sunny Moon'
The Vaselines at Anthem Magazine
The Vaselines interview May 2009
Article
AV Club: article
The Vaselines On Myspace
Sound on the Sound
Krist Novoselic: How I Learned to Love the Vaselines

Scottish alternative rock groups
Musical groups established in 1986
Scottish rock music groups
Musical groups from Glasgow
Sub Pop artists
Jangle pop groups
Scottish indie rock groups
British indie pop groups
1986 establishments in Scotland